Listen Here is the seventh album by American jazz vibraphonist Freddie McCoy which was recorded in 1968 for the Prestige label.

Reception

Allmusic rated the album 2 stars.

Track listing
All compositions by Freddie McCoy except where noted.
 "Don't Tell Me That" – 5:00
 "Short Circuit" – 6:50
 "Love for Sale" (Cole Porter) – 5:30
 "Listen Here" (Eddie Harris) – 7:40
 "MacArthur Park" (Jimmy Webb) – 8:00
 "Stone Wall" – 3:20

Personnel 
Freddie McCoy – vibraphone
Wilbur Buscomb, Edward Williams – trumpet (tracks 1 & 5)
Quentin Jackson, Melba Liston – trombone (track 1 & 5)
Gene Walker – alto saxophone, varitone (tracks 1 & 5)
JoAnne Brackeen – electric piano, organ
Wally Richardson – guitar (tracks 1 & 5)
Raymond McKinney – bass (tracks 2-4 & 6)
Jimmy Lewis – electric bass (tracks 1 & 5)
Bernard Purdie (tracks 1 & 5), Al Dreares (track 2-4 & 6)
Montego Joe – congas (tracks 1 & 5)

References 

1968 albums
Freddie McCoy albums
Prestige Records albums
Albums recorded at Van Gelder Studio
Albums produced by Cal Lampley